Stephen Silvasy Jr. (born October 24, 1941) was a major general in the United States Army who served as acting commander of United States Army Pacific in 1996. He is an alumnus of the US Military Academy and US Naval Postgraduate School. He also received military education at the Armed Forces Staff College and US Army War College.

Career 
Silvasy saw combat duty in three different countries. From 1964 to 1965 he participated in the US intervention in the Dominican Republic with the 82nd Airborne Division. From 1966 to 1967 he served with the 101st Airborne Division in Vietnam. In 1983 he was back with the 82nd Airborne for the invasion of Grenada.

As a young Lieutenant Colonel Silvasy was stationed in Korea between 1976 and 1978 as Battalion Commander of the 1/32nd Infantry Regiment, 3rd Brigade, 2nd Infantry Division with forward base at Camp Howze. The 1/32nd Infantry was a Congressional approved combat unit for the Demilitarized Zone. Before the unit temporarily disbanded on 28 May 1978 under the orders of President Jimmy Carter, Silvasy served with Richard A. Kidd who ultimately became the Ninth Sergeant Major of the Army.

Some of Silvasy's key duty assignments were as Director of the Operational Plans and Interoperability Directorate for the Joint Staff at the Pentagon. In Korea he served as Assistant Chief of Staff for the UN Command in Seoul. He also served as Deputy Chief of Staff for Doctrine and Development with the US Army Training and Doctrine Command (TRADOC) in Fort Monroe, Virginia. He was also Deputy Commanding General of US Army Pacific prior to his stint as commander.

Awards and decorations

References 

1941 births
Living people
United States Army personnel of the Vietnam War
United States Army War College alumni
Joint Forces Staff College alumni
Naval Postgraduate School alumni
Recipients of the Defense Distinguished Service Medal
Recipients of the Distinguished Service Medal (US Army)
Recipients of the Legion of Merit
Recipients of the Silver Star
Recipients of the Soldier's Medal
United States Army generals
United States Military Academy alumni